The discography of American country music artist Lorrie Morgan contains 18 studio albums, nine compilation albums, two video albums, one live album, 51 singles and 21 music videos. Morgan early releases were singles that reached lower-charting positions on the American Billboard Hot Country Songs chart. Morgan's 1988 single, "Trainwreck of Emotion", was her first to reach the Billboard country top 20. It was followed by her debut studio album in 1989 named Leave the Light On. It reached number six on the Billboard Top Country Albums chart and certified platinum in sales by the Recording Industry Association of America. The disc spawned three more top ten singles: "Dear Me", "Out of Your Shoes" and "He Talks to Me". Its fourth single, "Five Minutes", topped the Billboard country chart. Her second album was released in 1991 titled Something in Red. It reached number eight on the country albums chart and number 13 on the Canadian RPM Country Albums chart. In addition to certifying platinum by the RIAA, the disc included three top ten Billboard and RPM country songs: "We Both Walk", "A Picture of Me Without You" and "Except for Monday".

In 1992, BNA Records released her third studio album titled Watch Me. It became her third disc to certify platinum by the RIAA. Among its four singles was the number one Billboard and RPM country song, "What Part of No". Between 1993 and 1994, Morgan released the studio albums Merry Christmas from London and War Paint. In 1995, BNA issued the compilation, Reflections: Greatest Hits, which later certified two-times platinum in the United States. It featured several new recordings, including the number one single, "I Didn't Know My Own Strength". Greater Need (1996) reached Top Country Albums top ten and spawned the number four Billboard single, "Good as I Was to You". Shakin' Things Up (1997) reached a similar chart position and spawned the top five Billboard and RPM single, "Go Away". My Heart (1999) featured a top 20 duet with Sammy Kershaw called "Maybe Not Tonight". Morgan and Kershaw then collaborated on 2001 studio album, I Finally Found Someone. 

Morgan's next releases were issued on several independent labels. Her 2004 album, Show Me How, reached number 30 on the Billboard Top Independent Albums chart and spawned her final charting single to date: "Do You Still Want to Buy Me That Drink (Frank)". Her second studio album of Christmas music was issued in 2007 titled An Old Fashioned Christmas. It was followed by A Moment in Time (2009), which peaked at number 40 on the Top Country Albums chart. Morgan collaborated with country artist Pam Tillis on studio albums: Dos Divas (2013) and Come See Me and Come Lonely (2017). In 2016, Morgan released the studio project, Letting Go...Slow, which charted at number 47 on the country albums list. Since her last album project, she has issued several digital singles including a remake of "A Picture of Me (Without You)".

Albums

Studio albums

Compilation albums

Live albums

Singles

As lead artist

As a collaborative and featured artist

Videography

Video albums

Music videos

Notes

References

Country music discographies
Discographies of American artists